Rapar is one of the 182 Legislative Assembly constituencies of Gujarat state in India. It is part of Kachchh district. It is numbered as 6-Rapar.

List of segments
This assembly seat represents the following segments

 Rapar Taluka
 Bhachau Taluka rapar(Part) Villages – Dholavira, Kharoda, Kalyanpar, Janan, Ratanpar, Gadhada, Amarapar, Ganeshpar, Bambhanka, Bapurai, Bharudia, Kankhoi, Chobari, Kakarva, Kanthkot, Nara, Gamdau, Toraniya, Jadsa, Adhoi (Pasakayara), Pasa, Vasatva, Shivlakha, Lakadiya, Gharana, Rajansar, Khodasar, Rajthali, Chandrodi, Naransari, Katariya Juna, Katariya Nava, Laliana, Amaliyara, Jangi, Godpar, Vandhiya, Modpar, Lakhapar, Lakhdhirgadh (Alepar), Shikarpur

Members of Legislative Assembly

Election results

2022

2017

2014

2012

2007

2002

1998

1995

1990

1985

1980

1975

1972

1967

1962

See also
 List of constituencies of the Gujarat Legislative Assembly
 Kachchh district

References

External links
 

Assembly constituencies of Gujarat
Politics of Kutch district